Stoke City Football Club Under-21s is the most senior of Stoke City's youth teams and the club's former reserve team. The Under-23 team is effectively Stoke City's second-string side. They play in Premier League 2 Division 2. The team also competes in the Premier League Cup and Staffordshire Senior Cup.

They play their home matches at the club's main ground, the bet365 Stadium, St George's Park, Burton-on-Trent as well as the club's Clayton Wood Training Ground. In previous seasons the team has played at Lyme Valley Stadium in Newcastle-under-Lyme, Macclesfield Town's Moss Rose, Nantwich Town's Weaver Stadium and Harrison Park in Leek.

History
Stoke fielded a second team for the first time in a league competition, the Combination, in 1891–92, under the name of 'Stoke Swifts'. The Swifts also played in the Midland League and the local North Staffordshire & District League, which they won on two occasions. The team joined the Birmingham & District League in 1900–01 and was renamed 'Stoke Reserves'. They temporarily had to return to local leagues in 1908 after the first team suffered financial difficulties and had to resign from the Football League, taking the reserves' place in the Birmingham & District League. They returned in 1911–12 and continued to play in it until they joined the newly founded Central League, a specific reserve team only league. In 1925 after Stoke-on-Trent was granted City status the second string became "Stoke City Reserves". They won the Central League title in 1927–28 and remained in the league until the 1980s when a Division Two was created. Stoke were relegated in 1984–85, gaining promotion in 1991–92, but suffered instant relegation in 1992–93, however promotion was achieved in 1993–94. The league was restructured in 1996 with Stoke now in the Central League Premier Division, dropping down to Division One in 1999–2000. They won Division One in 2002–03 and then won the Premier Division in 2003–04. Stoke remained in the Central League until 2008.

Following the first team's promotion to the Premier League in 2008 the reserves joined the Premier Reserve League. In 2012 the Premier League implemented the Elite Player Performance Plan and introduced the Professional Development League, with reserve teams becoming under-21 teams. In The League was split into two in 2014–15, with Stoke playing in Division 2. In 2016 the league was re-branded Premier League 2 and the age limit increased to under-23. This was reverted back to under-21 from 2022–23.

Current squads

Under-21s

Out on loan

Under-18s

Honours

Leagues
The Central League 
 Champions: 1927–28, 2003–04
 Runner-up: 1934–35
 Division One (West) champions: 2002–03
 Division Two champions: 1991–92
North Staffordshire & District League
 Champions: 1895–96, 1898–99
 Runner-up: 1896–97
The Combination
 Runner-up: 1892–93, 1893–94
Midland Football League
 Runner-up 1894–95
Birmingham & District League
 Runner-up: 1903–04, 1904–05
 North Staffordshire Federation League
 Runner-up: 1908–09
Football League Youth Alliance
 Division Three North champions: 1998–99

Cups
FA Youth Cup
 Runners-up: 1983–84
Generation Adidas Cup
Winner: 2013–14
Altstatten International Tournament
 Runner-up: 2013–14 
Central League Cup
 Winner: 1996–97
 Runner-up: 2000–01
Midland Youth League Cup
 Winner: 1996–97
North Staffordshire Federation League Cup
 Runner-up: 1908–09

Staff
 Source:

 Academy management
 Academy Director: Gareth Owen
 Head of Academy Recruitment: Andrew Frost
 Head of Academy Coaching: James Hunter
 Head of Academy Sports Science & Athletic Development: Paul White
 Head of Academy Education: Greg Briggs
 Academy Medical Lead: Andy Foster
 Head of Player Care & Academy Safeguarding: Stephanie Wakelin
 Head of Academy Operations & Administration: Margaret Stringer

 Academy full-time coaching staff
 Lead Professional Development Phase Coach: Richard Walker
 Professional Development Phase Coach: Danny Pugh
 Senior Professional Development Phase Coach: Kevin Russell
 Senior Professional Development Phase Coach & Loans Manager: David Hibbert
 Lead Youth Development Phase Coach (U15-U16): Darren Potter
 Youth Development Phase Coach (U15): Liam Lawrence
 Lead Youth Development Phase Coach (U13-U14): Andy Matthews
 Lead Foundation Phase Coach (U10-U12): Theo Brierley
 Lead Foundation Phase Coach (U7-U9): Connor Russo
 Lead Academy Goalkeeping Coach: Richard Taylor
 Academy Goalkeeping Coach: Jack Shirley

Notable Academy graduates
A number players from the Stoke City Academy go on to have careers in professional football, whether at Stoke City or at other clubs. The following is a list of players who have played at a professional level since the Academy opened in 1998. Players who are listed in Bold have gained senior international caps.

  Matthew Bullock
  Clive Clarke
  Kris Commons
  Dean Crowe
  Carl Dickinson
  Tom Edwards
  Dale Eve
  Ben Foster
  Robert Garrett
  Marc Goodfellow
  Matthew Hazley
  Robert Heath
  Karl Henry
  Richard Keogh
  Neil MacKenzie
  Louis Moult
  Lewis Neal
  Curtis Nelson
  James O'Connor
  Gareth Owen
  Jermaine Palmer
  Martin Paterson
  Jimmy Phillips
  Adam Rooney
  Ollie Shenton
  Ryan Shotton
  Steven Taaffe
  Ádám Vass
  Nathaniel Wedderburn
  Andy Wilkinson
  Brian Wilson
  Steve Woods
  Ashley Woolliscroft

League performance

Reserves, U21s and U23s
 Source:

References

External links
 Stoke Under-21s at stokecityfc.com
 Stoke Under-18s at stokecityfc.com

Reserves and Academy
Football academies in England
Premier League International Cup